Nathan N. Muwombi was an Anglican bishop in Uganda: he was Bishop of North Mbale from 1997 to  2003.

References

21st-century Anglican bishops in Uganda
20th-century Anglican bishops in Uganda
Anglican bishops of North Mbale
Uganda Christian University alumni